Maurice Franklin McHartley (born August 1, 1942) is an American former professional basketball player. He played in the Continental Basketball Association (CBA) and American Basketball Association for a number of teams between 1964 and 1971. He won two CBA championships while playing for the Wilmington Blue Bombers in 1966 and 1967.

References

1942 births
Living people
American men's basketball players
Basketball players from Detroit
Dallas Chaparrals players
Delaware Blue Bombers players
Miami Floridians players
New York Nets players
North Carolina A&T Aggies men's basketball players
Pittsburgh Pipers players
Point guards
Shooting guards
St. Louis Hawks draft picks
Wilmington Blue Bombers players